The Co-Cathedral of Baza, also known as the Colegiata de Nuestra Señora Santa María de la Encarnación, is the main Roman Catholic church in Baza, Province of Granada, Spain. Begun in 1529 atop the site of a mosque, the initial Gothic architecture building collapsed after an earthquake two years later. It was elaborately rebuilt in a Renaissance style by 1549. The church has a tall bell-tower with an octagonal lantern.

References

16th-century Roman Catholic church buildings in Spain
Roman Catholic churches completed in 1549
Renaissance architecture in Andalusia
Roman Catholic cathedrals in Andalusia
Churches in Andalusia
Churches converted from mosques
Former mosques in Spain
1549 establishments in Spain

es:Iglesia Mayor de Baza